A foot deformity is a disorder of the foot that can be congenital or acquired.

Such deformities can include hammer toe, club foot, flat feet, pes cavus, etc.

References

External links 

Congenital disorders of musculoskeletal system